McMenamin is an Irish surname. In Gaelic it is rendered, Mac Meanman, meaning 'son of Meanma'  a name meaning courageous or high spirited. It originated in Co. Donegal in the 13th century. The first written mention of the name is in 1303 in the 'Annals of Loch Cé' which records the deaths of Donnchadh Mac Meanman and Aedh Mac Meanman, grandsons of the Lector O'Domnhaill, the chieftain of Fanad, during a dynastic struggle within the Cenél Conaill. The McMenamins are a branch of the O'Donnells of Tyrconnell (Donegal) and are part of the Sil Lugdach, descendants of Lugaid mac Sétnai, the great-grandson of Conall Gulban.  Like many discarded branches of noble families, the McMenamins sought advancement in the church evidenced by numerous mentions of McMenamin prelates in papal letters from the late 1300s to the late 1400s. They were supplanted in their home territory of Fanad by the Sweeneys and over the centuries became more distantly related to the royal line of the Cenél Conaill.  One scholar describes the family as "...a discarded branch of the O'Donnell dynasty" (Darren Mc Eiteagain . 1995 "Donegal History and Society: Interdisciplinary Essays on the History of an Irish County". Geography Publications: UCD)

The name appears again in the faints of Elizabeth I in 1601, this is a list of royal pardons. A pardon was granted to Neyce bane M'Manaman (sic), it's unclear what offence had been committed. In 1609 according to MacLysaght the McMenamins are named as followers of O'Donnell in the pardon rolls of James I. During the Cromwellian campaigns in Ireland many McMenamins dispersed to Mayo, particularly around Tonragee, Ballycroy and Achill, this area had ancient links with the O'Donnells. This Mayo migration resulted in variant spellings of the name such as McManamon and McManaman.

By the 19th Century the McMenamins like many of the Irish had spread throughout the world but still remained strong in their native northwest Ulster. Griffith's "Primary Valuation of Ireland" carried out 1847-1864 records 266 McMenamin households  not counting the variant spellings, 90% of these households were in Donegal and west Tyrone. An Gorta Mór (The Irish Famine) affected Ulster to a lesser extent than the rest of Ireland, but we still find 100 McMenamins disembarking at the port of New York from 1845-52. Even by 1890 the McMenamins still clung to their ancestral homelands, 36 McMenamin births were registered in Ireland this year but only 2 outside Ulster according to Matheson.

The name has given rise to many variants some of which are : McMeanmain, McMenamy, McMenemey, McMeneny, McManamon, McMenamon, McManaman, McMinn

Notable people with the surname include:

Brian McMenamin (born 1957), American businessman and philanthropist
Chris McMenamin (born 1989), Scottish footballer
Ciarán McMenamin (born 1975), Irish actor
Colin McMenamin (born 1981), Scottish footballer
Daniel McMenamin (1882–?), Irish politician and barrister
Eugene McMenamin (born 1947), Irish politician
James McMenamin (1910–2000), Australian cricket umpire
Joseph J. McMenamin, United States Marine Corps general
Kevin McMenamin, Irish Gaelic football player
Mark McMenamin, American paleontologist
Paul McMenamin (born 1956), Australian academic
Ryan McMenamin, Canadian-born Irish Gaelic footballer
Conor McMenamin, Irish footballer

See also
McMenamins, hospitality company (e.g. pubs in the northwestern U.S.)
McManaman, surname

Surnames of Irish origin